Wünschendorf/Elster is a municipality in the district of Greiz, in Thuringia, Germany. The municipality is seat of a municipal association with eleven members.

References

Municipalities in Thuringia
Greiz (district)